The Earl and Oza Crownover-Brown House is a historic house at 133 South Broadway in Damascus, Arkansas.  It is a single story masonry structure, built out of sandstone with cream-colored brick trim.  It has a side gable roof, with front cross gable and a central entrance topped by a small gable, with a chimney to the door's left.  The house was built 1943 by Silas Owen, Sr., a local master mason, and is one of the finest examples of his work.

The house was listed on the National Register of Historic Places in 2006.

See also
National Register of Historic Places listings in Faulkner County, Arkansas

References

Houses on the National Register of Historic Places in Arkansas
Houses completed in 1943
Houses in Faulkner County, Arkansas
National Register of Historic Places in Faulkner County, Arkansas